Olney Elementary School is a historic elementary school located in the Olney neighborhood of Philadelphia, Pennsylvania. It is part of the School District of Philadelphia. The building built in 1900–1901 and is a two-story ashlar and smooth limestone building in the Georgian Revival-style. It features a projecting pedimented center bay and arched limestone entrance surround.

The building was added to the National Register of Historic Places in 1986.

References

External links

School buildings on the National Register of Historic Places in Philadelphia
Georgian Revival architecture in Pennsylvania
School buildings completed in 1901
Olney-Oak Lane, Philadelphia
Public K–8 schools in Philadelphia
School District of Philadelphia
1901 establishments in Pennsylvania